Obolno (or Obunu) is a small dispersed settlement in the hills north of Stična in the Municipality of Ivančna Gorica in central Slovenia. The area is part of the historical region of Lower Carniola. The municipality is now included in the Central Slovenia Statistical Region.

Name
The name Obolno follows an adjectival declension ( Obolnega,  na Obolnem). It is believed to derive from Common Slavic *abolьnъ 'apple', referring to the local vegetation. In the local dialect, the name is pronounced abau̯nə̏ ( abúnəga,  na abúnəm).

Cultural heritage
A small roadside chapel-shrine in the settlement dates to the early 20th century.

References

External links

Obolno on Geopedia

Populated places in the Municipality of Ivančna Gorica